Ilkeston Football Club was an English semi-professional football club based at the New Manor Ground in Ilkeston, Derbyshire, England.

History
The club was established in 2010 as the successor club to Ilkeston Town, whose record was expunged on 8 September 2010 as they were subject to a winding up order in the high court over an unpaid £47,000 tax bill.  Two months after liquidating, a new club was reformed as Ilkeston F.C. and were admitted into the Northern Premier League Division One South in May 2011.

The club won promotion at the end of its first season by beating Leek Town 2–0 in front of 1,670 supporters in the play off final after finishing 3rd behind runaway winners Grantham Town.  The Robins suffered a bad start to their 2012–13 campaign winning only two games in their first seventeen, although a turnaround later on in the season saw them pick up a further thirteen victories which led them to a  mid-table finish in their first season in the Northern Premier League Premier Division.

In June 2017 the club was wound-up following a hearing at Liverpool Crown Court, with the club £14,438 in debt.

In July 2017 a new club, Ilkeston Town F.C. founded by Notts County chairman Alan Hardy, replacing the liquidated Ilkeston FC, started play at the New Manor Ground in Ilkeston.

Honours

Northern Premier League Division One South
Play-off Winners: 2011–12
Derbyshire Senior Cup
Winners: 2012–13, 2013–14.

References

External links
Ilson Football – Unofficial history website

 
Association football clubs established in 2010
2010 establishments in England
Ilkeston
Northern Premier League clubs
Association football clubs disestablished in 2017
2017 disestablishments in England
Defunct football clubs in England
Defunct football clubs in Derbyshire
Phoenix clubs (association football)